Jakkrit Bunkham (born December 7, 1982), simply known as Jay, is a Thai retired professional footballer who played as an attacking midfielder.

International career

Jakkrit was a member of the Thailand national football team during 2004 to 2010.

Honours

Clubs
Osotsapa
 Queen's Cup: 2002, 2003, 2004
 Kor Royal Cup: 2001, 2006

Thai Port
 Thai League Cup: 2010

International 
Thailand U-23
 Sea Games Gold Medal: 2005

References

External links
 Profile at Goal

1982 births
Living people
Jakkrit Bunkham
Jakkrit Bunkham
Association football midfielders
Jakkrit Bunkham
Jakkrit Bunkham
Jakkrit Bunkham
Jakkrit Bunkham
Jakkrit Bunkham
Jakkrit Bunkham
Jakkrit Bunkham
Jakkrit Bunkham
Southeast Asian Games medalists in football
Competitors at the 2005 Southeast Asian Games